The following is a list of episodes of Question Time, a British current affairs debate television programme broadcast by BBC Television.



Year overview

Presenters

Highest appearance makers

Episode guide

1979

1980

1981

1982

1983

1984

1985

1986

1987

1988

1989

1990

1991

1992

1993

1994

1995

1996

1997

1998

1999

2000

2001

2002

2003

2004

2005

2006

2007

2008

2009

2010

2011

2012

2013

2014

2015

2016

2017

2018

2019

2020

2021

2022

2023

Notes

References

External links 
 Future programmes
 Archived Radio Times listing (1979–2009)

Lists of British non-fiction television series episodes
Question Time (TV programme)
Question Time episodes